Cudillero (Asturian: Cuideiru) is a municipality in the Principality of Asturias, Spain. Nowadays, Cudillero's main economic activities are related to tourism, but it is also known for its fishing industry. A legend says that it was founded by the Vikings. In addition to Castillian some locals still speak a dialect called Pixueto.

Usually, Spanish-media considers Cudillero as one of the most beautiful villages in Spain.

Coat of Arms 
(See image at right)
Top left: Arms of the Pravia family.
Top right: Arms of the Omaña family.
Bottom: A reference to the Church of San Pedro.

Way of Saint James 
The Way of Saint James, named The Northern Way (Camino de la Costa) passes through Cudillero. There is also a Pilgrim Heritage Hostal: Albergue de Peregrinos «Soto de Luiña» - Soto de Luiña, s/n – 3156-Cudillero with 20 Beds. Phone 985-59.00.03

Politic

Parishes 
Cudillero has nine parishes (administrative divisions):
Ballota (Val.louta)
Cudillero (Cuideiru)
Faedo
Novellana
Oviñana (Ouviñana)
Piñera
San Juan de Piñera (San Xuan de Piñera)
San Martín de Luiña (Samartín de Lluiña)
Soto de Luiña (Soutu Lluiña)

Demography

References

External links 
Ayuntamiento de Cudillero
 Cudillero turismo
 Cudillero images – August 2006

Municipalities in Asturias